Harry George Kite is an English professional footballer who plays as a midfielder for  side Exeter City.

Career
Kite joined the Exeter City Academy at the under-9 stage, and went on to make his first-team debut on 29 August 2017, coming on as a ninth-minute substitute for Luke Croll in a 3–1 EFL Trophy group stage defeat to Yeovil Town at St James Park.

On 16 August 2019, Kite was loaned out to Taunton Town for three months. On 30 October Exeter confirmed, that the deal had been extended until January. On 9 January 2020, the deal was extended once again, this time until the end of the season.

He scored his first goal for Exeter in an EFL Trophy tie against Swindon Town on 6 October 2020. Injuries to Nigel Atangana and Archie Collins saw Kite become a regular in the first team at the start of the 2021–22 season, and he went on to score his first League goal for Exeter in a 4–1 victory over Bristol Rovers on 21 August 2021.

Style of play
Kite is an energetic midfielder with a good passing range and long-range shooting ability.

Career statistics

Honours
Exeter City
League Two runner-up: 2021–22

Individual
 EFL League One Goal of the Month: August 2022

References

External links
Harry Kite player profile at Exeter City

Living people
People from Crediton
English footballers
Association football midfielders
Exeter City F.C. players
Dorchester Town F.C. players
Taunton Town F.C. players
English Football League players
Southern Football League players
2000 births